Nkamba, also Nkamba New Jerusalem, is a town in the province of Kongo Central of the Democratic Republic of Congo.

The town is the birthplace of Simon Kimbangu and has become the spiritual headquarters of Kimbanguism.
The town is home to the temple of the Kimbanguist Church. Near the temple is the mausoleum of the founder "Papa" Simon Kimbangu and his three sons, "Papa" Charles Kisolokele Lukelo, "Papa" Salomon Dialungana Kiangani and "Papa" Joseph Diangienda Kuntima.

References

Populated places in Kongo Central